Karazhal (Qarajal) is a town of regional significance in Ulytau Region of central Kazakhstan. Population:  

It is the town closest to where the Soyuz 11 mission landed. The crew members of Soyuz 11 were the first three people to die outside the  Earth's atmosphere.

References

Ulytau Region